Melvin Herbert Evans (August 7, 1917 – November 27, 1984) was a Virgin Islander politician, who served as the appointive, and the first elected governor of the United States Virgin Islands, serving from 1969 to 1975. After serving as governor he was delegate from the United States Virgin Islands to the United States House of Representatives from 1979 to 1981.

Evans was born in Christiansted in Saint Croix, and attended Howard University, Washington, D.C. and the University of California, Berkeley.  He was the Virgin Islands health commissioner, and was appointed governor of the United States Virgin Islands, serving from 1969 until 1971. He was the first elected Governor in 1970 and served from 1971 until 1975. Evans was a Republican National Committeeman and served as a delegate to the 1972 Republican National Convention and 1976 Republican National Convention.

On November 7, 1978, Evans was elected delegate to the United States House of Representatives from U.S. Virgin Islands as a Republican. He defeated Democrat Janet Watlington, an aide to outgoing delegate Ron de Lugo, with 10,458 votes, or 52% of the vote. Watlington placed second 9,588 votes, equaling 48% of the total votes cast.  Evans served as delegate in the House from January 3, 1979 to January 3, 1981. He was an unsuccessful candidate for reelection in 1980, losing to former delegate Ron de Lugo.

Evans was appointed United States ambassador to Trinidad and Tobago, and served until his death.  He is interred in Christiansted Cemetery in Saint Croix.

See also
List of African-American United States representatives

References

External links

 Profiles of Outstanding Virgin Islanders (includes link to photo)

|-

|-

|-

1917 births
1984 deaths
20th-century African-American politicians
African-American men in politics
20th-century American politicians
African-American diplomats
African-American members of the United States House of Representatives
African-American people in United States Virgin Island politics
Ambassadors of the United States to Trinidad and Tobago
Delegates to the United States House of Representatives from the United States Virgin Islands
Governors of the United States Virgin Islands
Howard University alumni
People from Saint Croix, U.S. Virgin Islands
Republican Party governors of the United States Virgin Islands
Republican Party members of the United States House of Representatives from the United States Virgin Islands
Republican Party of the Virgin Islands politicians
United States Virgin Islands politicians
Burials in the United States Virgin Islands